Thomas White Neill (November 7, 1919 – September 22, 1980) was an American professional baseball player and outfielder who appeared in Major League Baseball in parts of two seasons (1946–1947) with the Boston Braves. For his MLB career, he compiled a .255 batting average in 55 at-bats, with 14 hits (including two doubles and one triple) and seven runs batted in.

As a member of the 1946 Birmingham Barons, Neill led the Double-A Southern Association in hits (207), batting average (.374) and runs batted in (124). In 1949 with the Nashville Volunteers of the same circuit, Neill came in second in the batting race,  finishing with an average of .3460 — just .0004 behind Pat Haggerty, who later became known as a longtime National Football League referee.

Neill spent 15 years in professional baseball (1938–1943, 1946–1954). He died in Houston, Texas, at the age of 60.

References

External links

1919 births
1980 deaths
Atlanta Crackers players
Baseball players from Alabama
Birmingham Barons players
Boston Braves players
Clinton Giants players
Fort Smith Giants players
Hartford Bees players
Jersey City Giants players
Lincoln Chiefs players
Los Angeles Angels (minor league) players
Major League Baseball outfielders
Milwaukee Brewers (minor league) players
Nashville Vols players
People from Hartselle, Alabama
Seattle Rainiers players
Springfield Cubs (Massachusetts) players
Springfield Rifles players
Williamsport Grays players